Mambugan National High School is a public high school located at Phase 3, Siruna Village, Brgy. Mambugan, Antipolo in the Philippines.

History 
Mambugan National High School formerly named Antipolo National High School – Mambugan Extension, was established when the former Mayor Angelito Gatlabayan and the City Council passed the Resolution # 04 -99.

School started 
June 1999 was the time when the school started. Mambugan Elementary School lends three (3) rooms which housed the administration building and two classrooms with a population of 240 students and 5 faculty members. Ms. Marilyn D. Zapanta was the school head, Mrs. Corazon S. Oliva (Math), Ms. May Arcenio (English), Ms. Margaret V. Bajan (TLE), Mrs. Gemma V. Cruz (Science & Values-Guidance Counselor) and Mr. Darwin D. Jaradal (AP/Filipino) as the pioneer faculty members.

School building 
The first official building of Mambugan National High School (ACG Bldg) was built last 2003 with four (4) rooms in its own site located at Ruhat Hills, Siruna Village with a total land area of 3,200 m2. The ACG Bldg. was used by the second batch of students during their fourth year. The first graduation of Mambugan National High School on the new site last April 2004 with 215 graduates.

The land area of the school became bigger with the initiative of the local government. In the year 2006, another building or the Principal and Admin Office. and now Several buildings were then constructed after that as follows:

Today, MNHS has 33 classrooms, 5 Computer Lab, Library, Clinic, TLE Room, Administration Bldg (Principal, OIC, Liaison and Accounting Office), a covered court and stage.

Even though the population increases with lesser rooms to be occupied by the students, the faculty members did their best in teaching these students. That is why the quality of education is not sacrificed. With 119 teaching force, a principal and two accounting staff, the school functions well in which our school ranks 5th in the NAT for two consecutive years.

In the succeeding years of the school, the population gradually increased as follows:

Principal 
Ms. Marilyn D. Zapanta was the first school head, from 1999 – Sept ember 15, 2005, Dr. Adelina M. Cruzada, our principal from September 16, 2005 – Sept 20, 2011, Ms. Adelaida A. San Diego from September 21, 2011, up to July 10, 2013, Mr. Rommel S. Beltran from July 15, 2013 - June 2016 and Mrs. Anna Lyn P. Raymundo June 5, 2016 up to present. The school will not come this far and excel academically if not for their unequal dedication and commitment in their profession, the school heads that keeps the mission and vision of the school.

References 

Educational institutions established in 1999
High schools in Rizal
Schools in Antipolo
1999 establishments in the Philippines